The Focke-Wulf Ta 152 is a World War II German high-altitude fighter-interceptor designed by Kurt Tank and produced by Focke-Wulf.

The Ta 152 was a development of the Focke-Wulf Fw 190 aircraft. It was intended to be made in at least three versions—the Ta 152H Höhenjäger ("high-altitude fighter"); the Ta 152C designed for medium-altitude operations and ground-attack, using a Daimler-Benz DB 603 and smaller wings; and the Ta 152E fighter-reconnaissance aircraft with the engine of the H model and the wing of the C model.

The first Ta 152H entered service with the Luftwaffe in January 1945. The Ta 152 was produced too late and in insufficient numbers to have a significant role in the war.

Development

Fw 190
The Fw 190's BMW 801 engine was originally designed for bomber and transport aircraft flying at medium altitudes in the  range. In keeping with this role it used a relatively simple single-stage supercharger that lacked performance above  altitude. This presented a problem for fighter use, where high-altitude performance was desirable. Through careful tuning, the Fw 190 instead emerged as a powerful medium altitude design. Several experimental models of the 190 with different engines were tested with improved high altitude performance, but these were not high priority projects.

At these altitudes, the 190 found itself at a disadvantage, becoming acute in early 1944 when the long range P-51 Mustang arrived in quantity. This led to the introduction of the Fw 190D-9, mounting the Junkers Jumo 213E engine. This engine had a two-stage supercharger and much better altitude performance. However, the rest of the aircraft's design, especially the relatively short wings, made it difficult to fly at high altitudes. While the D-9 upgrade was expedient, it was not ideal.

High-altitude fighters
Rumours of the B-29, which would cruise at altitudes at which no German aircraft could comfortably operate, added impetus for a dedicated high-altitude design. The Reichsluftfahrtministerium (German Air Ministry, or "RLM") requested proposals from both Focke-Wulf and Messerschmitt for a high-altitude interceptor. Messerschmitt answered with the Bf 109H, and Focke-Wulf entered a range of designs; the Fw 190 Raffat-1 (Ra-1) fighter would replace the existing 190D series, the Ra-2 was a dedicated high altitude fighter, and the Ra-3 was a ground-attack aircraft.

These designs developed into the Fw 190 V20 (Ta 152A), V21 (Ta 152B) and V30 (Ta 152H) prototypes, all based on the 190D-9 but with varying degrees of improvement. The V20 used the same Jumo 213E engine as the Fw 190D-9, while the V21 used the DB 603E. Neither of these offered any significant improvement over the 190D-9, and further development of the Ta 152A and B was cancelled. The V21 airframe, however, was further modified as the V21/U1 and became the prototype for the Ta 152C.

Japanese version
The IJAAF acquired, in April 1945, the licence, schemes and technical drawings for manufacturing the Ta 152 in Japan. During the last stages of the conflict in Germany, with the plight of the Japanese armed forces growing ever bleaker, a large volume of the latest aviation technology Germany had to offer was given to or bought by both the Japanese army and naval air arms in the hopes that it would stem the tide of defeats and ever increasing pressure by the superior Allied air forces.

Design
Kurt Tank originally designed the Ta 152 using the 44.52 litre displacement Daimler-Benz DB 603 engine as it offered better high-altitude performance and also a greater developmental potential. The DB 603 had been used in the Fw 190C prototypes but had many problems and was considered too difficult to fit in the Ta 152 by RLM officials. With this in mind, Tank focused his efforts on the 213E as the Ta 152H engine. He insisted that the DB 603 be retained for the Ta 152C versions and as an option for later versions of the Ta 152H.

The aircraft design was therefore given the prefix Ta.

The Ta 152's fuselage was an extended version of the Fw 190D-9 fuselage with wider-chord fixed vertical tail surfaces (especially the top half), and hydraulic rather than electrically controlled undercarriage and flaps. Due to the changes in the center of gravity and overall balance, the nose was also lengthened.

Due to the war's impact on aluminium availability, the wing was built around two steel spars, the front extending from just past the landing gear attachment points, and the rear spar spanning the entire wing. The wing itself was designed with 3° of washout, from the root to the flap-aileron junction, to prevent the ailerons from stalling before the centre section of the wing.

The Ta 152 also featured the FuG 16ZY and FuG 25a radio equipment (some aircraft were issued with FuG 125 Hermine D/F for navigation and blind landing, LGW-Siemens K 23 autopilot, and a heated armoured glass windscreen for bad-weather operations).

High-altitude features
To reach higher altitudes, a  pressurized cockpit was added to the H models. The canopy was sealed by a circular tube filled with rubber foam which was inflated by a compressed air bottle, while the engine compartment was also sealed from the cockpit with a rubber foam ring. A Knorr 300/10 air compressor provided the pressure, maintaining the cockpit at 0.37 Bar (5.29 psi) above 8,000 m (26,250 ft). To prevent fogging, the windscreen was of a double-glazed style with a 6 mm (.236 in) thick outer pane and a 3 mm (.118 in) inner pane with a 6 mm (.236 in) gap. The gap was fitted with several silica gel capsules to absorb any moisture forming between the panes. The cockpit was not pressurized in the C models.

Armament
The H model had heavy armament to allow it to deal quickly with enemy aircraft. It had three weapons: one 30 mm (1.18 in) MK 108 Motorkanone cannon centered within the propeller hub and two 20 mm MG 151/20 cannons, synchronised to fire through the propeller, located in the wing roots. The C model was designed to operate at lower altitudes than the H-model with the same armament plus two more MG 151/20 cannon synchronised as the additional autocannon for the C-model were mounted just ahead of the windscreen, and above the engine's upper rear crankcase. The Ta 152C could destroy the heaviest enemy bombers with a short burst but the added weight decreased speed and rate of turn.

Performance
The Ta 152H-1 was among the fastest piston-engined fighters of the war, with a top speed comparable to the twin-engined Dornier Do 335. Kurt Tank was flying an unarmed Ta 152H in late 1944 to a meeting at the Focke-Wulf plant in Cottbus when ground controllers warned him of two P-51 Mustangs. The enemy aircraft appeared behind Tank, but he escaped by applying full power and engaging the MW 50 boost "until they were no more than two dots on the horizon".

Operational history

By October 1944, the war was going poorly for Germany. RLM realised the urgency pushing Focke-Wulf to quickly have the Ta 152 into production. As a result, several Ta 152 prototypes crashed early into the test program. It was found that critical systems were lacking sufficient quality control. Problems arose with superchargers, pressurised cockpits leaked, the engine cooling system was unreliable at best due in part to unreliable oil temperature monitoring, and in several instances the landing gear failed to properly retract. A total of up to 20 pre-production Ta 152 H-0s were delivered from November 1944 to Erprobungskommando Ta 152 to service test the aircraft. It was reported that test pilots were able to conduct a mere 31 hours of flight tests before full production started. By the end of January 1945, only 50 hours or so had been completed.

III./Jagdgeschwader 301, initially a Luftwaffe Wilde Sau unit, was ordered to convert to the type in January 1945, which it did (and flew them operationally for a short time). In the end, Ta 152s were pooled in a special  JG 301, first based at Alteno Air Base near Luckau, then at Neustadt-Glewe in Mecklenburg. The  never had more than 15 Ta 152Hs available, both H-0s and H-1s. Since the usual transfer system had broken down, replacement parts became nearly impossible to obtain.

An early Ta 152 combat occurred on 14 April 1945 when  Willi Reschke tried to intercept a De Havilland Mosquito over Stendal but failed to catch up due to engine trouble. On the evening of that same day, Reschke was to demonstrate that the Ta 152H could be used as a low altitude fighter. A section of four Hawker Tempest Vs of 486 (NZ) Squadron were out on patrol. After attacking a train near Ludwigslust, the section split up into pairs; Wing Commander Brooker ordered the Tempests flown by Flying Officer S. J. Short and Warrant Officer Owen J. Mitchell to make their own way back to base. On the way back, this pair, which was strafing targets along the railway tracks near Ludwigslust, was spotted by lookouts posted at Neustadt-Glewe. Three Ta 152s – flown by Reschke,  Aufhammer and  Sepp Sattler – were scrambled, catching the Tempests by surprise. Reschke recalled:

It is assumed that Sattler was shot down either by Sid Short or Bill Shaw of 486 Sqn, who claimed a Bf 109 E in the same area. Operational missions were flown in April 1945 from Neustadt, mostly escorting close support aircraft to the Battle of Berlin. Reschke claimed two Yakovlev Yak-9s near Berlin on 24 April, while Obfw. Walter Loos, claimed four air victories on 24, 25 and 30 April.

The Ta 152 score at the end of the war was probably seven victories and four losses in air combat, although a degree of uncertainty about those numbers exists. Four victories were achieved by Josef Keil, from 1 March 1945 to 21 April 1945, and at least three victories were achieved by Willi Reschke. The Ta 152 was delivered to JG 301 on 27 January 1945 and the first Ta 152 mission against American bombers took place on 2 March 1945. There was no contact with the Americans because the 12 Ta 152s were forced to fend off repeated attacks by the Bf 109s of another German unit, as the shape of the Ta-152 was virtually unknown to other . There were no losses, as the climbing ability and manoeuvrability of the Ta 152s enabled them to evade these attacks.

The four losses in air combat were: Hptm. Hermann Stahl, killed on 11 April 1945; Obfw. Sepp Sattler, killed on 14 April 1945; two unknown JG11 pilots, downed by Spitfires in the last days of April 1945 during transfer from Neustadt-Glewe to Leck airfield.

Production
The total number of Ta 152 aircraft produced is unknown. Malcolm Lowe notes: 

By February 1945, all Ta 152 production had ceased. According to Peter Rodeike, 44 Ta 152 H-0/V and 25 Ta 152 H-1 were built; total Ta 152 production is unknown.

Variants
Ta 152 C-0
Pre-production aircraft, 1 prototype built powered with 2,100-hp (1566 kW) Daimler Benz DB603LA engine. The extra length of this engine, as with the Jumo 213-powered Fw 190D-9, required a compensating rear fuselage plug and enlarged tail surfaces, and wing span was increased to 36 ft 1 in (11 meters). All "C" variants were intended for low to medium-altitude operations.
Ta 152 C-1
Standard wing (11.00 m (36 ft 1 in)), armed with one engine-mounted Motorkanone 30 mm (1.18 in) MK 108 cannon and four 20 mm synchronized MG 151/20 cannons (two above the engine, two in the wing roots).
Ta 152 C-2
Standard wing (11.00 m (36 ft 1 in)), equipped with an improved radio.
Ta 152 C-3
Standard wing (11.00 m (36 ft 1 in)), armed with one engine-mounted Motorkanone 30 mm (1.18 in) MK 103 cannon and four 20 mm synchronized MG 151/20 cannons (two above the engine, two in the wing roots).
Ta 152 E-1
Photographic reconnaissance version of the Ta 152C, with standard wing (11.00 m (36 ft 1 in)).
Ta 152 E-2
High-altitude photographic reconnaissance version, powered by a Junkers Jumo 213E engine and with the H-series wing (14.44 m (48 ft 6 in)). Only a single prototype was completed.
Ta 152 H-0
20 pre-production aircraft, H-series wing (14.44 m (48 ft 6 in)). All "H" variants were intended for medium to high altitude operations.
Ta 152 H-1
The only production version. H-series wing (14.44 m (48 ft 6 in)), armed with one engine-mounted Motorkanone 30 mm (1.18 in) MK108 cannon and two 20 mm synchronized MG 151/20 cannons in the wing roots, additional fuel tanks located in the wings.

Surviving aircraft
There is only one surviving Ta 152, a 152 H-0 variant flown by III./ 301, a Luftwaffe  unit. The aircraft is housed at the National Air and Space Museum Paul E. Garber Preservation, Restoration, and Storage Facility in Suitland, Maryland, United States, where it is expected to be restored.

The aircraft is believed to be Werk-Nummer (serial number) 150020, which was a pre-production H-0 model transitioning to full production Ta 152H-1 series aircraft. It was probably built at Focke-Wulf's production facility at Cottbus, Germany, in December 1944, and delivered to Erprobungskommando Ta 152 at Rechlin, Germany, for service testing.

Operators

 Luftwaffe

Specifications (Ta 152 H-1)

See also

References

Notes

Bibliography

 Angelucci, Enzo. The Rand McNally Encyclopedia of Military Aircraft, 1914-1980. San Diego, California: The Military Press, 1983. .
 Donald, David, ed. Warplanes of the Luftwaffe. London: Aerospace Publishing, 1994. .
 Ethell, Jeff. Ta 152 (Monogram Closeup 24). Sturbridge, Massachusetts: Monogram Aviation Publications, 1990. .
 Hermann, Dietmar.  Focke-Wulf Ta 152: The Story of the Luftwaffe's Late-War High-Altitude Fighter. Atglen, Pennsylvania: Schiffer Publishing Ltd, 1999. .
 Hermann, Dietmar. Focke-Wulf Ta 152: Der Weg zum Höhenjäger (in German). Oberhaching, Germany: AVIATIC Verlag GmbH, 1998. .
 Lowe, Malcolm. Focke-Wulf Ta 152. Prague: 4+ Publications (Mark I Ltd.), 2008. .
 Lowe, Malcolm. Production Line to Front Line #5, Focke-Wulf Fw 190. London: Osprey, 2003. .
 Mondey, David. The Hamlyn Concise Guide to Axis Aircraft of World War II. London: Bounty Books, 2006. .
 Nohara, Shigeru, Focke-Wulf Fw 190D & Ta 152 Modeling Guide. Tokyo, Japan:  Model Art Co. Ltd., 2001.
 Myhra, David. Focke-Wulf Ta 183 (X Planes of the Third Reich). Atglen, Pennsylvania: Schiffer Publishing, 1999. .
 Reschke, Willy, Jagdgeschwader 301/302 "Wilde Sau": In Defense Of The Reich With The Bf 109, Fw 190 And Ta 152. Stuttgart, Germany:  Motorbuch Verlag, 1998. .
 Shimoda, Ken-ichi, Military Aircraft Vol. 65. Tokyo, Japan:  Delta Publishing Co. Ltd., 2001.
 Shores, Christopher and Chris Thomas. 2nd Tactical Air Force. Volume III: From the Rhine to Victory: January to May 1945. Hersham, UK: Ian Allan Publishing, 2006. .
 Sortehaug, Paul. The Wild Winds; The History of Number 486 RNZAF Fighter Squadron with the RAF. Dunedin, New Zealand: Otago University Print, 1998. .

Ta 152
1940s German fighter aircraft
World War II fighter aircraft of Germany
Low-wing aircraft
Single-engined tractor aircraft
Ta 152
Aircraft first flown in 1944